The 2002 Paris–Roubaix was the 100th running of the Paris–Roubaix single-day cycling race, often known as the Hell of the North. These are the results for the 2002 edition of the Paris–Roubaix cycling classic, in which Johan Museeuw entered history by winning his third Paris–Roubaix after an impressive attack 40 kilometres from the Velodrome of Roubaix. This edition was run under wind and rain conditions.

Results
14-04-2002: Compiègne–Roubaix, 261 km.

References

External links
Race website

2002
2002 in road cycling
2002 in French sport
Paris-Roubaix
April 2002 sports events in France